City of Dead Men is a horror film directed by Kirk Sullivan, marking Sullivan's directorial debut, and starring Diego Boneta, Jackson Rathbone and María Mesa. The film tells the story of Michael, an American traveler that arrives in Medellín where he meets Melody, who introduces him to a radical group of young men called "The Dead Men"  who live in an abandoned psychiatric hospital.

References

External links
 
 

American horror thriller films
2014 films
2010s thriller films
2014 horror films
Films set in Colombia
Colombian horror films
2014 directorial debut films
2010s English-language films
2010s American films